Abies ziyuanensis is a species of fir, a conifer in the family Pinaceae. It is only known from four locations in Guangxi and Hunan provinces in China. A. ziyuanensis is related to Abies beshanzuensis, another threatened fir endemic to China.

While the population was in the thousands as recently as the 1970s, there are now thought to be less than 600 trees in existence.

References

ziyuanensis
Endemic flora of China
Flora of Guangxi
Flora of Hunan
Trees of China
Endangered flora of Asia
Taxonomy articles created by Polbot
Plants described in 1980